Radnor Valley Football Club is a Welsh football team based in New Radnor, Presteigne.  The team currently play in the Mid Wales Football League East Division, which is at the fourth tier of the Welsh football league system.

History
The original version of the club was formed in 1921. The current incarnation of the club dates from 1984.

Honours

Mid Wales Football League League Cup – Winners: 2021–22
Mid Wales South League - Champions: 2014–15
Radnorshire Cup – Winners: 2017–18
Radnorshire Cup – Finalists: 1964–65, 1971–72, 2018–19, 2021–22
Mid Wales South League Cup – Winners: 1971–72

External links
Official club Twitter
Official club Facebook

References

Association football clubs established in 1921
1921 establishments in Wales
Mid Wales Football League clubs
Football clubs in Wales
Mid Wales South League clubs
Presteigne
Sport in Powys